Vilnius International Airport  is the airport of Vilnius, the capital of Lithuania. It is the largest of the three commercial airports in Lithuania by passenger traffic. With one runway and 5 million passengers a year. Vilnius International Airport serves as a base for airBaltic, Ryanair, and Wizz Air. The airport is managed by state-owned enterprise Lithuanian Airports under the Ministry of Transport and Communications.

History

Early years

The airport began operations on 17 August 1932 as Wilno–Porubanek, Porubanek was the name of the neighbouring village which today is part of the Kirtimai district of Vilnius. Before World War II, it operated the then-domestic route between Wilno (Vilnius) and Warsaw as well as international route to Riga. Since 15 April 1939, it inaugurated a new route to Kovno (nowadays Kaunas). The airport was used as a military airfield during WWII. The airport resumed its activity as a civil airport as of 17 July 1944.

Recent developments
Lithuanian Airlines (branded later as FlyLAL) was established as the Lithuanian flag carrier following independence in 1991 and inherited the Vilnius-based Aeroflot fleet of Tupolev Tu-134, Yakovlev Yak-40, Yak-42 and Antonov An-24, An-26 aircraft, but rapidly replaced these Soviet-era aircraft types with modern Boeing 737 and Boeing 757 jets and Saab 340, Saab 2000 turboprops. Operations were suspended effective 17 January 2009 as a result of growing financial difficulties. With the collapse of flyLAL, the airport lost its scheduled services to Amsterdam, Budapest, Istanbul, Madrid and Tbilisi. flyLAL used to operate to Dublin, Frankfurt, London, Milan and Paris in competition with Aer Lingus, airBaltic or Lufthansa.

AirBaltic, the national airline of Latvia and under Scandinavian Airlines part-ownership, opened up a second base at Vilnius in 2004 to complement its Riga operation and became the largest carrier at Vilnius, using Boeing 737 jets and Fokker 50 turboprops. At one point, airBaltic operated to 19 destinations from Vilnius but, in 2009, the network covered only three destinations served by two aircraft based at Vilnius.

Vilnius Airport is the main hub for Grand Cru Airlines and a base for Wizz Air. It used to be a main hub for Star1 Airlines until their end of operations in September 2010 and Aurela until Aurela had lost its flight license. It was the hub for Small Planet Airlines and Aviavilsa until both airlines folded. The airport was a secondary hub for airBaltic, Estonian Air and Skyways Express until they closed the bases in Vilnius.

On 30 June 2013, Air Lituanica also began its flights from the Vilnius Airport and established its base there serving several European cities. However, by 22 May 2015, the airline shut down all operations as well.

The airport was closed for 35 days from 14 July 2017 to 17 August 2017 (inclusive) for runway reconstruction work, with all flights diverted to Kaunas Airport.

Terminal
The construction of the airport building started in 1949 and completed in 1954. It features a standard 1950s Soviet airport terminal design, originally intended for an airport with up to 20 aircraft movements per day. On the outside, it is decorated with sculptures of soldiers, workers and aviators, while inside walls and ceilings feature wreaths, bay leaves and stars, and until the early 1990s, the Soviet hammer and sickle, typical decor for Soviet public buildings of early post-war years.

A new departure terminal, connected with the old building, was built in 1993. Since then, the old building has been used as the arrival terminal only.

In November 2007, the new  terminal building was opened for operations which improved the capacity and facilities of the airport and complies with the requirements of the Schengen agreement.  The passenger throughput of the terminal increased, passenger service quality was improved and more stringent aviation security measures were implemented. The new area of the renovated passenger terminal now reaches . It is equipped with 6 passenger boarding bridges, modern passenger check-in equipment, new travel value and duty-free shops were opened as well as business lounge and VIP Lounge.

New departure terminal 
A new  departure terminal is currently under construction at Vilnius Airport. After the completion of this 14,400 sq. m. terminal, the total area of Vilnius Airport passenger terminals will increase by a third, and passenger throughput will double – from 1,200 passengers per hour to 2,400. In parallel with the construction of the new terminal, a redevelopment of road infrastructure will also be carried out: engineering networks will be updated, the coating will be changed, roofs will be installed and a new, much more permeable transport scheme will be created. The terminal is scheduled to open in early 2025 and will cost 50.2 million euros.

Airlines and destinations

Passenger

The following airlines operate regular scheduled and charter flights to and from Vilnius:

Cargo

Statistics

Passenger traffic

Annual traffic

Busiest routes

Most frequent routes

Ground transportation

Train
Direct train services between Vilnius Airport Railway Station (referred to as "Oro uostas" in the schedules) and the central station of Vilnius were started in October 2008.

Bus
The direct intercity express services operate from the Airport to Klaipėda, Palanga, Minsk and Daugavpils. Also, the Latvian company Flybus.lv operates service from Vilnius airport to Riga (via Panevėžys and Bauska).

Public transportation
City's public buses operate from the airport. Tickets can be bought from: Trafi, M.Ticket. Also, the company Toks transports passengers from the bus station to Vilnius airport and back by microbuses.

Aviation services 
Passenger handling, aircraft handling, into-plane fueling and de-icing/anti-icing services are handled by BGS and Litcargus.

Incidents and accidents
 Scandinavian Airlines Flight 2748, operated with Dash-8-400 (LN-RDS) with 48 passengers and 4 crew members, took off from Copenhagen Airport on 12 September 2007. It was heading to Palanga, Lithuania, but was diverted to Vilnius Airport (better suited for an emergency landing) when landing gear problems were discovered before landing. Upon touchdown, the right landing gear collapsed. All passengers and crew were evacuated safely. The local officials at the Vilnius International Airport noted that this was the most serious incident in recent years. This accident, along with the Aalborg accident just days earlier, caused all SAS Dash 8 Q400 planes to be grounded until the beginning of October.
 On 23 May 2021, Ryanair Flight 4978, operated using a Boeing 737-8AS with 171 passengers on board, traveling in Belarusian airspace en route from Athens to Vilnius, was intercepted by a Belarusian MiG-29 before it could reach Lithuanian airspace. It was then forced to land at Minsk National Airport. Upon landing, the Belarusian KGB arrested two of the passengers, opposition activist Roman Protasevich and his girlfriend Sofia Sapega. The other passengers were allowed to reboard the plane to depart for Vilnius after seven hours.

See also
 List of largest airports in the Baltic states
 List of the busiest airports in Europe
 Transport in Lithuania

References

External links

  
 Interview with CCO of Vilnius Airport
 

Airports in Lithuania
Airports established in 1944
Airports built in the Soviet Union
Airport
Aviation in Vilnius
1944 establishments in the Soviet Union
International airports in Lithuania